The 1947 South Carolina Gamecocks football team was an American football team that represented the University of South Carolina as a member of the Southern Conference (SoCon) during the 1947 college football season. In its seventh season under head coach Rex Enright, the team compiled a 6–2–1 record (4–1–1 against conference opponents), finished in third place in the conference, and outscored opponents by a total of 113 to 85.

Schedule

References

South Carolina
South Carolina Gamecocks football seasons
South Carolina Gamecocks football